Malevolence is the third album by deathcore band I Declare War. It is the last album to feature Jonathan Huber on vocals before his departure, and the first album to feature Chris Fugate on guitar, Brent Eaton on bass, and Ryan Cox on drums.

Track listing

Personnel
I Declare War
Jonathan Huber - Vocals
Evan Hughes - Guitars
Chris Fugate - Guitars
Brent Eaton - Bass
Ryan Cox - Drums
Production
Shawn Carrano - Management
Chris Common - Editing, Engineer, Mixing, Producer, Tracking
Alan Douches - Mastering
Colin Marks - Artwork
Alex Wade - Management

2010 albums
I Declare War (band) albums